List of Governors of the northeastern Mexican state of Coahuila de Zaragoza, since its establishment as the province of Nueva Extremadura in Northern New Spain, later province of Coahuila and Texas, and Coahuila as a Mexican state.

Coahuila during Spanish Colonial period 
 
(Includes period of Nueva Extremadura and Coahuila y Texas)

Coahuila as a Mexican state

Coahuila state since the Mexican Revolution

External links
 Provinces of New Spain
 Government of Coahuila

Coahuila